The Methodist Girls' School, Klang (abbreviated MGS Klang) is a semi-government-aided, all-girls' school—consisting of a primary (Sekolah Kebangsaan Perempuan Methodist Klang) and secondary (Sekolah Menengah Kebangsaan Perempuan Methodist Klang) school—located on Jalan Raya Barat (Great West Way) in the Klang District of Selangor state, in Malaysia. The school was established by Ruth Eklund on 24 May 1924, after she discovered that there were a number of female pupils attending the Anglo Chinese School during the academic year.

History
In 1921, when Selangor was occupied by the British, Reverend Abel Eklund and his wife Ruth arrived in Klang, and Rev. Eklund succeeded Mr. Lim Chin Kheng as the principal of the Anglo Chinese School, which a number of girls were attending. On 24 May 1924, with support and help from the Methodist Church and colonial administrator and scholar Sir Richard Winstedt, Ruth Eklund founded the Methodist Girls' School at Jalan Bukit Jawa, Klang. In 1926, four classrooms and an office were built at Jalan Sultan. One more classroom was built with a donation from Sultan Alam Shah, making the school government-aided. Ruth Eklund served as the school's principal until 1927.

In 1934, 7 students sat for the Junior Cambridge examination for the first time in the school’s history. In 1936, Ruth Eklund returned to the school to help with the building of two more classrooms and the renovation of the original buildings. In 1938, 3 students sat for the Senior Cambridge examination for the first time in the school’s history.

The school reopened in September 1945, after being closed during the World War II occupation of the Malay Peninsula by Japanese army, beginning in February 1942. The nearby Anglo Chinese School had been the local headquarters of the Japanese army during the war.

The building, used for the secondary school, was officially opened by Raja Jemaah Tengku Ampuan Selangor on 10 May 1952. In 1954, a second building—consisting of four classrooms, a Home Economics (KHB) lab, and a hall—was built. This building was officially opened by Raja Jemaah on 10 April 1955. In 1955, the building at Jalan Sultan, used as the primary school, was demolished by the local municipal council, Majlis Perbandaraan Klang. A new building was built as a substitute for the demolished building. The new building, officially opened by Tengku Ampuan Rahimah, on 26 July 1957, consisted of six classrooms, an office for teachers, a hall, a library, and an office.

The school was then separated into a primary and a secondary school, each directed by a different principal. In 1962, a new building consisting of three classrooms, two science labs, a home science lab, a geography class, and toilets was built. In 1969, more land was acquired, and a building consisting of a science lab, two home science labs, and four classrooms was built. In 1975, the school started a Lower-Sixth class for art-stream students. Starting in 1976, students of the school are able to sit for the STPM without traveling to other examination centres. In 2001, a new mosque, and other facilities, for Muslim students, was built to replace the former mosque made from shipping containers. A canteen was built the same year.

On 12 April 2014, the school held the Gala Nite, a fundraising gala, in Hin Hua High School. The funds raised were used for upgrading the school's square, facilities, and Eklund Hall. The school is one of the few government schools in Malaysia that offers Japanese language classes.

Demographics (Secondary) 
1,483 students attended Methodist Girls' School in the 2016-17 school year. The school employs a teaching faculty of 88 for an average student-teacher ratio of 17:1.

Academics 
77 (25%) out of 309 SPM candidates from Methodist Girls' Schools achieved 5A's and above in 2015, of which 15 (5%) candidates achieved all A's and a 95.8% passing rate. The school has 40 clubs and societies.

School Attire (Secondary) 
On normal school days, students are required to wear a white and turquoise Baju Kurung, with optional white tudung for Muslims, or turquoise pinafore with white collared-shirt for non-Muslims, and white socks and white canvas shoes. All students are required to wear a cadet uniform every Wednesday. PE shirt, optional white or black arm socks, long dark-colored track pants, and sport shoes are allowed on certain days.

Prefects (school leaders) wear white collared-shirt, a green-yellow tie, a dark green skirt, and a white tudung, white socks and black canvas shoes. Senior prefects wear cream-colored blazer, with dark green vest for junior prefects.

School librarians wear a white collared-shirt, a maroon tie, a maroon skirt, and a white tudung, and white socks and white canvas shoes.

Members of the school's co-op wear a purple Baju Kurung, and tudung, or a pinafore and a white collared-shirt, along with white canvas shoes and white socks.

References

External links
 School History – SMK (P) Methodist Klang (in Malay)
 The Interact Club (of MGS Secondary)

Educational institutions established in 1924
Methodist schools in Malaysia
Primary schools in Malaysia
Secondary schools in Malaysia
1924 establishments in British Malaya
Girls' schools in Malaysia
Publicly funded schools in Malaysia